Elizabeth Russell may refer to:

 Elizabeth Hoby (1528–1609), (née Cooke and later Lady Elizabeth Russell in her second marriage), associate of Elizabeth I of England
 Elizabeth Russell, Duchess of Bedford (1818–1897), bridesmaid to Queen Victoria
 Elizabeth von Arnim (1866–1941), German author sometimes known by her married name
 Elizabeth Russell (actress) (1916–2002), American actress
 Elizabeth S. Russell (1913–2001), American geneticist
 Elizabeth Russell (Upper Canada) (1754-1822), United Empire Loyalist, brother of Peter Russell, Inspector General of Upper Canada
 Elizabeth Russell (cricketer) (born 1994), English cricketer

See also
 Betsy Russell (born 1963), American actress whose birth name is Elizabeth Russell